Elk City is a city in Beckham County, Oklahoma, United States. The population was 11,693 at the 2010 census, and the population was estimated at 11,577 in 2019.

History

European exploration

In 1541, Francisco Vásquez de Coronado became the first known European to pass through the area. The Spanish conquistador was traveling northeast across the prairie in search of a place called Quivira, a city said to be fabulously wealthy with gold. Because Coronado's route across the plains is speculative, it is quite possible that the expedition passed through present-day Elk City or the nearby area.

Founding to statehood
Elk City's history dates back to the days immediately following the opening of the Cheyenne-Arapaho reservation in western Oklahoma Territory on April 19, 1892, when the first white settlers made their appearance. Prior to this time, many early ranchers had driven cattle over the Great Western Cattle Trail from Texas to Dodge City, Kansas, the present townsite of Elk City being in the direct path of that famous trail.

The creation of Elk City was an idea conceived by land promoters from Weatherford, Oklahoma, when they learned that the Choctaw, Oklahoma and Gulf Railroad (CO & G) was coming to the area (in 1898, the CO & G Railroad completed its western route to Weatherford; beginning in 1901, it continued building west). They formed the Choctaw Townsite and Development Company. These men with great foresight determined that the area at the source of Elk Creek would be an ideal location for a town, so they came to the area to purchase lands from the homesteaders who had claims along the railroad.

Probably the most important day in Elk City's history is March 20, 1901, the date the first lots were sold by the Choctaw Townsite and Development Company. By this time, hundreds of prospective purchasers had built a tent city. On that day, the townsite company sold $32,000 worth of property (about $870,000 in 2012 dollars) and continued doing a good business for some time thereafter.
 
There is some confusion about how Elk City got its name. Elk City was so named because it is located at the head of Elk Creek, which in turn was named by U.S. Army Captain Randolph B. Marcy who was leading an expedition to explore the Red River in 1852. Marcy and his troops had left the Wichita Mountains and the waterway which he named Otter Creek during his exploration, and they were traveling northwest along the North Fork of the Red River. On May 31, in the official journal of the expedition, Marcy wrote about the productive soil, the dense grass, and the vertical red clay banks of a "bold running stream of good water." Continuing, he wrote, "From the circumstance of having seen elk tracks upon the stream we passed in our march today, I have called it 'Elk Creek'. I am informed by our guide that five years since, elk were frequently seen in the Wichita Mountains; but now they are seldom met with in this part of the country." Confusion also stems from the early post offices that served the residents of the town. Even though the town of Elk City has had only one name, its early settlers were served by a post office named Crowe, and later, one named Busch. Consequently, on many early maps of Oklahoma Territory the names of "Crowe" or "Busch" are seen instead of "Elk City". Finally, on July 20, 1907, shortly before statehood, the Busch Post Office had its name officially changed to Elk City Post Office.

On August 13, 1901, the Choctaw, Oklahoma and Gulf Railroad (purchased in 1904 by the Chicago, Rock Island and Pacific Railroad in 1904) laid its last rail on the so-called "Choctaw Route", bringing rail access to Elk City. The first regular train service commenced seven days later on August 20, and city folk rejoiced, predicting that the dugouts, claim shacks, and prairie stables would soon disappear and be replaced by handsome residences, commodious barns, and granaries.
  
By January 1902, Elk City had more than sixty businesses and a population exceeding 1,000. Paving the streets with bricks also began in 1902. Though not yet a year old, the town had become one of the largest in western Oklahoma. Even with two devastating fires (one on October 28, 1903, which destroyed more than a dozen businesses, and the other in March 1906 which burned sixteen businesses to the ground), Elk City continued to grow into a major transportation and commercial hub, and by statehood in 1907, the population had more than tripled to 3,000 people. The prairie community had become a boomtown.

Geography
Elk City is located in northeastern Beckham County at  (35.402694, -99.423812), elevation .

Climate

According to the Köppen Climate Classification system, Elk City has a humid subtropical climate, abbreviated "Cfa" on climate maps.

Demographics

As of the census of 2010, there were 11,693 people living in the city.  The population density was 718.8 people per square mile (277.6/km).  There were 4,973 housing units at an average density of 340.1 per square mile (131.3/km). The racial makeup of the city was 88.95% White, 3.06% African American, 3.02% Native American, 0.54% Asian, 0.03% Pacific Islander, 2.25% from other races, and 2.15% from two or more races. Hispanic or Latino of any race were 5.96% of the population.

There were 4,159 households, out of which 34.4% had children under the age of 18 living with them, 51.4% were married couples living together, 12.2% had a female householder with no husband present, and 32.2% were non-families. 28.1% of all households were made up of individuals, and 12.9% had someone living alone who was 65 years of age or older. The average household size was 2.47 and the average family size was 3.02.

In the city, the population was spread out, with 27.2% under the age of 18, 9.5% from 18 to 24, 27.3% from 25 to 44, 20.5% from 45 to 64, and 15.5% who were 65 years of age or older. The median age was 36 years. For every 100 females, there were 92.2 males. For every 100 females age 18 and over, there were 89.3 males.

The median income for a household in the city was $28,268, and the median income for a family was $35,383. Males had a median income of $28,380 versus $18,977 for females. The per capita income for the city was $15,654. About 15.4% of families and 19.1% of the population were below the poverty line, including 27.2% of those under age 18 and 5.0% of those age 65 or over.

Economy
Today, Elk City is the principal center of trade for Western Oklahoma and part of the Texas Panhandle, with a  trade radius that serves more than 50,000 people. Petroleum, agriculture, wind energy, transportation, tourism, manufacturing, and healthcare all contribute to Elk City's economy.

Since the 2000 census, Elk City has had a nearly 3% growth in jobs. Over the next decade, the number of jobs available in Elk City is expected to skyrocket by about 42%.

Since Elk City lies in a rich oil and natural-gas area on the shelf of Oklahoma's Anadarko Basin, the petroleum industry is the heart of the city's economy. Because of this, the city is the self-proclaimed "Natural Gas Capital of the World", complete with Parker Drilling Rig #114, located downtown. Elk City has enjoyed significant growth due to the opening and location of oil field services and drilling companies in the city.

Agriculture doesn't play as prominent of a role as it did in the 20th century, with the only remaining viable agricultural market being the livestock auction. Nevertheless, Elk City still serves as a vital retail center for farmers and ranchers in the area.

The Red Hills Wind Farm includes 82 wind turbine generators that produce 123 MW of clean energy, enough to power more than 40,000 homes.

Transportation has played an important part in Elk City's economy throughout its history, beginning with the building of the famed U.S. Route 66 through the heart of the city in the early 1930s. Today, Interstate 40 serves the city, with 60,000 consumers traveling through Elk City each day, and connects with Oklahoma City to the east and Amarillo, Texas, to the west. The city is also served by Oklahoma State Highway 6, which connects Elk City with Altus to the south, and Oklahoma State Highway 34, connecting Elk City with Woodward to the north. The Elk City Regional Business Airport is located in the northeast part of the city,  from the Interstate.

Given that Historic U.S. Route 66 runs through Elk City, a sprawling museum complex has developed, which includes the National Route 66 Museum, the Old Town Museum, the Transportation Museum, the Farm and Ranch Museum, and the Blacksmith Museum. Each museum is housed in separate buildings, which altogether depict a mockup of early Elk City, complete with general stores, bank, a railroad depot and train caboose, opera house, and other buildings. Elk City is also in close proximity to many other attractions in Western Oklahoma, including Foss State Park, Foss Reservoir, the Washita National Wildlife Refuge, Black Kettle National Grassland, the Wichita Mountains, the Antelope Hills, the Quartz Mountains, and the Washita Battlefield National Historic Site.

Bar-S Foods Company operates a packaged-meat warehouse and distribution center in Elk City.

Great Plains Regional Medical Center is Elk City's largest employer and serves Western Oklahoma and the eastern Texas Panhandle. The hospital has been named by OKCBusiness and Best Companies Group as one of the "Thirty Best Places to Work in Oklahoma" for three consecutive years: 2006, 2007, and 2008.   On May 11, 2007, construction began on a new, $60 million,  hospital that opened in July 2009.

In June 2009, it was announced that a Walmart Supercenter would be constructed, bringing at least 150 jobs to the city. Soon afterward, a $2.2 million federal grant was provided through the American Recovery and Reinvestment Act of 2009 to help fund the project and bring more jobs to Elk City. It opened in October 2010 off I-40 at Exit 40. Featuring  area, it is the largest store between Amarillo and Oklahoma City.

Education
Two school districts include section of Elk City, with the former covering more of Elk City:
Elk City Public Schools 
Merritt Public Schools 

Elk City Public Schools and Merritt Public Schools are members of the Western Technology Center District. WTC provides the opportunity for adults and high school students to get occupationally-specific training. As a member of the WTC district, high school juniors and seniors living in the Elk City School District and Merritt School District have the opportunity to attend classes at WTC. High school students who are residents of the WTC District can enroll in WTC full-time training on a tuition-free basis. Adult students are allowed to attend classes on a tuition basis. Tuition for adult students is $2.00 per training hour. Adult students can apply for financial assistance to attend WTC.

Media

Newspaper
 Elk City Daily News

Radio
 KECO 96.5 FM (Country)
 KKZU 95.5 FM (Classic Rock)
 KOOL 94.3 FM (Classic Hits)
 KADS 1240 AM (Sports Talk)

Transportation

Intercity bus service is provided by Greyhound Lines.

Elk City Regional Business Airport (KELK; FAA ID: ELK), 1 mile northeast, has a 
5399’ x 75’ paved runway.

Commercial air transportation is available at Will Rogers World Airport, about 112 miles east, or Rick Husband Amarillo International Airport, about 140 miles west.

Attractions

National Register of Historic Places

 Casa Grande Hotel
 Hedlund Motor Company Building
 Storm House
 Whited Grist Mill

Stops on Route 66
 National Route 66 Museum Complex

Museums
 Elk City features five museums:  the Old Town Museum, the National Route 66 Museum, the National Transportation Museum, the Farm and Ranch Museum, and the Blacksmith Museum. Another museum, the Anadarko Basin Museum of Natural History, is currently closed due to lack of funding.

Notable people
 Cade Davis,  European basketball player
 Keitha Dickerson, basketball player, Texas Tech and WNBA
 Richard Hart, jazz guitarist
 Justin McBride, PBR world champion bull rider
 Scott Meacham, State Treasurer of Oklahoma (2005–2011)
 Kelli O'Hara, award-winning Broadway actress, singer, and songwriter
 Susan Powell, Miss America 1981, actress, and singer
 Joe Spencer, NFL player
 Jimmy Webb, Grammy Award-winning songwriter

References

Further reading
 Elk City - Rising from the Prairie, Western Oklahoma Historical Society (2007)
 Prairie Fire, Western Oklahoma Historical Society (1978)

External links
 Elk City official website
 Elk City Chamber of Commerce
 Encyclopedia of Oklahoma History and Culture - Elk City
 A Step Back in Time in Elk City, Oklahoma from Legends of America

Cities in Beckham County, Oklahoma
Cities in Oklahoma
Micropolitan areas of Oklahoma
Populated places established in 1901